Gegechkori is a Georgian surname. Notable people with the surname include:

Evgeni Gegechkori (1881–1954), Georgian nobleman, politician, and revolutionary
Sasha Gegechkori (1887–1928), Georgian Bolshevik activist 
Nina Gegechkori (1905-1991), wife of Lavrentiy Beria

Georgian-language surnames